is a male Japanese author who has written many erotic novels based from adult Japanese visual novels. He has been writing such novels since 2001. He has notably written novels for the past four visual novels by Hooksoft: Orange Pocket, Like Life, _Summer, and HoneyComing.

Works
_Summer
HoneyComing
Like Life
Lost Passage
Orange Pocket
Soul Link
Triangle Heart 3

References

Japanese writers
Living people
Year of birth missing (living people)